Veve is a 2014 Kenyan drama film directed by Simon Mukali. VEVE is a co-production of One Fine Day Films and Ginger Ink.

Plot
Amos, an unscrupulous local Member of Parliament, wants to become Maua's Governor in the upcoming elections whilst expanding his business interests. He is a key supplier to the exporter of veve, Wadu, a shrewd businessman, who commands a sizeable share of the business. Following a conversation with his backdoor accountant, Amos sees an opportunity to upgrade his working relationship with Wadu and acquire a bigger stake in the business. He shares his plan with his right-hand man Sammy, who has been instrumental in building Amos’ influence, doing the dirty work for him. But Sammy's penchant for such assignments is waning. Still mourning his wife's death despite the passage of a few years, Sammy is struggling to connect as a father with his rebellious, glue-sniffling son Kago.

Amos’ bold plan hits a snag when Wadu brushes off his proposal, driving Amos into taking things by force. He puts in motion a chain of events to drive Wadu out of business. Meanwhile, veve farmers in Maua who get peanuts for their crop want to better their lot by forming a union, led by the elderman Mzee.

Amos ambition has gradually led to a flagging marriage with his wife Esther, though he does not seem to notice this. Esther enjoys the comfort of the wealth he has, but misses out on the affections of a loving man. When she discovers he is sleeping with other women, she does not take it lightly anymore.

Kenzo, an ex-convict, is a bitter man seeking revenge by hunting down the man who killed his father: Amos. He attempts to assassinate Amos at a campaign rally and fails. Undeterred, he seeks the help of fellow ex-convict Julius, and they hatch a multi-pronged plan to attack the business interests of both Wadu and Amos simultaneously, triggering a fatal clash between the two and ultimately destroying Amos.

In a twist of events, Esther's and Kenzo's paths cross and she ends up finding solace in his arms, totally oblivious that she is falling for her husband's grim reaper. Elsewhere, Wadu suspects that his troubles have something to do with a competitor.

Sammy burns down Mzee's farm as a lesson to the unionists. As Mzee's grandson Morris wonders what to do next, his impulsive friend and wannabe documentary filmmaker Clint tries to confront Amos, which only makes matters worse.

Inevitably, things boil over. Kenzo and Julius raid both Amos’ and Wadu's business interests, and Julius pays with his life. Amos hunts down Kenzo as Sammy is torn between obeying his orders and finding his son who has run away from home. Esther struggles between being faithful to the man she married and saving the man she just met. Wadu's patience runs out after he finds out the source of his troubles, and he hires an assassin to finish off Amos.

Background
Following the success of feature film Soul Boy, One Fine Day Films and Kenyan-based production company Ginger Ink partnered with DW Akademie to design a two-module training initiative: One Fine Day Films Workshops. The first module, a classroom-like "mini film school", deepens and expands the skill set and cinematic language of already practicing African filmmakers. It widens cinematic perspectives, exposure and vocabulary. From 18 to 29 June 2012, the third ONE FINE DAY FILM Workshops were held in Nairobi, Kenya. 56 participants from eleven African countries were invited to enhance their skills in the fields of directing, production, scriptwriting, editing, sound, production design and cinematography under the mentorship of experienced film professionals. Out of those participants a creative team from all departments was formed to shoot VEVE nine months later: Simon Mukali from Kenya was selected to direct the movie, mentored by Sven Taddicken. Egyptian participant Mayye Zayed and Kenya's Shiv Mandavia as the cinematographers and many more in various departments – Veve was born. Written by Kenyan Scriptwriter Natasha Likimani, it is a high- octane multi character story that gives a glimpse of the contemporary realities within the Khat trade in Kenya.

Festivals
2014
 Durban International Film Festival
 Filmfest Hamburg

Cast
 Emo Rugene as Kenzo
 Lizz Njagah as Esther
 Conrad Makeni as Sammy
 Lowry Odhiambo as Amos
 Adam Peevers as Clint
 Victor Munyua as Morris
 David Wambugu as Kago
 Joseph Peter Mwambia as Mzee
 Delvin Mudigi as Julius
 Albert Nyakundi as Corrupt Policeman
 Philip Mwangi as Bernard
 Fidelis Nyambura as Betty
 Mary Gacheri as Mzee's Wife
 Salim Paul as Wadu Junior

Awards and nominations

Kalasha international awards

Reception

Critical response 
Damaris Agweyu writing for KenyaBuzz had trouble matching the film to its trailer. She wrote: "More often than not, movies are unable to live up to their incredible trailers. With VEVE, it was the complete opposite; the trailer was unable to live up to the movie. Which to me, is just plain odd...They under promised and over delivered"

References

External links 
 
VEVE at Rushlake Media
One Fine Day Films Official Site

2014 films
Kenyan drama films
English-language Kenyan films
English-language German films